Lipoleucopis is a genus of flies belonging to the family Chamaemyiidae.

The species of this genus are found in England.

Species:
 Lipoleucopis praecox Meijere, 1928 
 Lipoleucopis pulchra Raspi, 2008

References

Chamaemyiidae